Rafał Szymura (born 29 August 1995) is a Polish professional volleyball player. At the professional club level, he plays for Jastrzębski Węgiel.

He competed for Poland at the 2013 U19 World Championship held in Mexico.

Honours

Clubs
 National championships
 2018/2019  Polish Cup, with ZAKSA Kędzierzyn-Koźle
 2018/2019  Polish Championship, with ZAKSA Kędzierzyn-Koźle
 2020/2021  Polish Championship, with Jastrzębski Węgiel
 2021/2022  Polish SuperCup, with Jastrzębski Węgiel
 2022/2023  Polish SuperCup, with Jastrzębski Węgiel

Youth national team
 2013  CEV U19 European Championship
 2014  CEV U20 European Championship

Individual awards
 2013: CEV U19 European Championship – Best Receiver
 2019: Polish Cup – Best Receiver

References

External links
 
 Player profile at PlusLiga.pl  
 Player profile at Volleybox.net

1995 births
Living people
People from Rybnik
Polish men's volleyball players
AZS Częstochowa players
ZAKSA Kędzierzyn-Koźle players
GKS Katowice (volleyball) players
Jastrzębski Węgiel players
Outside hitters